Basic Education High School No. 4 Botataung (commonly known as Botataung 4 High School or St. Mary's Convent School), located in Botataung township, is a public high school in Yangon. The building of all girls school is a landmark protected by the city, and is listed on the Yangon City Heritage List.

References

Girls' schools in Yangon
High schools in Yangon